David Morse (born 1953) is an American actor.

David Morse may also refer to:

 David Morse (writer) (born 1938), British literary author
 David Morse (politician) (born 1954), politician in Nova Scotia, Canada
 David A. Morse (1907–1990), American bureaucrat
 David Shannon Morse (1943–2007), cofounder of Amiga
 David L. Morse, American geophysicist, eponym of the Antarctic Morse Spur